"Security Intelligence Service" may refer to:

 Canadian Security Intelligence Service
 New Zealand Security Intelligence Service
 Tiger Organization Security Intelligence Service

See also 
 Secret Intelligence Service
 Signals Intelligence Service
 Special Intelligence Service
 Security Service (disambiguation)